The NFL rates its passers for statistical purposes against a fixed performance standard based on statistical achievements of all qualified pro passers since 1960. The current passer rating system, which was adopted in 1973, removes inequities that existed in the former method and, at the same time, provides a means of comparing passing performances from one season to the next.
According to the 2017 NFL Record & Fact Book, it is important to remember that the system is used to rate passers, not quarterbacks. Statistics do not reflect leadership, play-calling, and other intangible factors that go into making a successful professional quarterback.

Four categories are used as a basis for compiling a rating:
 Percentage of completions per attempt
 Average yards gained per attempt
 Percentage of touchdown passes per attempt
 Percentage of interceptions per attempt
The average standard is 1.000. The bottom is .000. To earn a 2.000 rating, a passer must perform at exceptional levels, i.e., 70 percent in completions, 10 percent in touchdowns, 1.5 percent in
interceptions, and 11 yards average gain per pass attempt. In order to make the rating more understandable, the point rating is then converted into a scale of 100, with 158.3 being the
highest rating a passer can achieve. In cases where statistical performance has been superior, it is possible for a passer to surpass a 100 rating. 
Quarterbacks are required to throw at least 1,500 passes before their ratings qualify for NFL career statistics for the regular season, and 150 attempts for the postseason.

Regular season

Quarterbacks must have at least 1,500 career attempts to qualify for this list.  
Updated through the 2022 regular season

Postseason
Quarterbacks must have at least 150 career postseason attempts to qualify for this list.

Updated through the 2022-23 playoffs.

All-time rankings in the four categories
These are the top 10 quarterbacks  in each statistic that determine the NFL passer rating.  
Minimum: 1,500 Attempts
Records through the 2022.regular season

See also
Passer rating
List of National Football League career passing completions leaders
List of National Football League career passing touchdowns leaders
List of National Football League career passing yards leaders
List of National Football League annual passer rating leaders
List of National Football League annual passing touchdowns leaders
List of National Football League annual passing yards leaders
List of National Football League annual pass completion percentage leaders

References

External links
NFL Single-Season Passer Rating Leaders
NFL Active Passer Rating Leaders
NFL Year-by-Year Passer Rating Leaders
NFL Single Game Passer Rating Leaders

Passer
Passer
National Football League lists